Juraj Amšel (17 December 1924 in Zagreb – 7 August 1988) was a Croat water polo player who competed for Yugoslavia in the 1948 Summer Olympics.

He was part of the Yugoslav team that was eliminated in the second round of the 1948 Olympic tournament. He played two matches. Four years later he was a squad member of the Yugoslav Olympic team in the 1952 tournament but did not play in a match. Again in 1956 he was a squad member but did not play a single match in the 1956 tournament.

See also
 Yugoslavia men's Olympic water polo team records and statistics
 List of men's Olympic water polo tournament goalkeepers

External links
 
 Juraj Amšel's profile at Proleksis Enciklopedija 

1924 births
1988 deaths
Sportspeople from Zagreb
Croatian male water polo players
Yugoslav male water polo players
Water polo goalkeepers
Olympic water polo players of Yugoslavia
Water polo players at the 1948 Summer Olympics
Water polo players at the 1952 Summer Olympics
Water polo players at the 1956 Summer Olympics